The 2019 Supercoppa di Serie C was the 20th edition of Supercoppa di Serie C.

Pordenone won their first title.

Rules 

The competition is made up of the three winning teams of their respective groups of the 2018–19 Serie C. All matches are one-legged.

 Matchday 1:The resting team and the home team are defined by drawing lots.
 Matchday 2:The resting team is the one that won matchday 1. If matchday 1 ends in a draw, the team that played matchday 1 away rests.
 Matchday 3: The two teams not faced in the previous two matchdays face off.

Results

References 

2019–20 in Italian football cups